The Prestonian-class ocean anti-submarine escort frigate was a class of 21 frigates that served with the Royal Canadian Navy from 1953–1967 and with the Royal Norwegian Navy from 1956–1977.

They were converted from mothballed s of British design that had been placed in reserve following the end of the Second World War. The class did not use sequential pennant numbers.

History
During the Korean War, Canada committed to the North Atlantic Treaty Organization (NATO). It was believed at the time that there was a strategic threat to the shipping lanes supplying the European continent by the Soviet Union. This belief originated due to Soviet submarines becoming increasingly difficult to detect and identify, as a result of their updated technology.

Vice-Admiral H.T.W. Grant, Chief of the Naval Staff of Canada, promised that Canada would contribute anti-submarine escort forces to combat the threat. Originally that meant updating only the existing fleet, however this policy was expanded when 21 decommissioned River-class frigates were converted to ocean escorts and recommissioned into the Royal Canadian Navy.

The concept of anti-submarine warfare performed from a helicopter operating from the decks of escorts had been first proposed during the Second World War. Canada was the first nation to test a fully capable anti-submarine warfare helicopter flying from an escort.  had a helicopter flight deck attached to her stern and performed sea trials from October to December 1956. These trials preceded the design of the destroyer helicopter carriers of the Royal Canadian Navy.

They were purchased outright in 1959 and were the only export of the class.

Modifications

The River-class frigate was a successful Canadian-built escort design from the Second World War, However, there was a requirement to update this design to meet the needs of the post-war Canadian Navy and to match the threat of the Soviet submarine force.

The fo'c'sle deck was extended aft and was wall-sided. This extra space was primarily devoted to improved habitability. All accommodation throughout the ship was improved. Each crew member was given their own bunk. The space was also used for generating machinery required by for anti-submarine warfare. This machinery was changed from three steam and one diesel to two steam and two diesel generators. The quarterdeck was enclosed to house two Squid anti-submarine mortars.

A much larger bridge structure was installed that was almost entirely enclosed. The upper works were constructed of aluminum instead of steel to save weight. This necessitated a heightened funnel to clear the new structure, which in turn required a larger mast. This mast remained a tripod. The propelling machinery was overhauled and the hull forward was strengthened forward to protect against ice.

One ship, Buckingham, had a flight deck attached aft for helicopter landing and takeoff sea trials, but the structure was removed once the trials were completed.

Ships

References

Notes

External links

 Prestonian-class frigates – hazegray.org

 
Frigate classes
Frigates of the Royal Canadian Navy
River-class frigates
River-class frigates of the Royal Canadian Navy